Gerardo Tobar López Airport  is an airport serving the Pacific coastal port of Buenaventura in the Valle del Cauca Department of Colombia.

The Buenaventura VOR-DME (Ident: BUN) is located on the field.

Airlines and destinations

See also

Transport in Colombia
List of airports in Colombia

References

External links
OpenStreetMap - Buenaventura
OurAirports - Buenaventura
SkyVector - Buenaventura

Airports in Colombia
Buildings and structures in Valle del Cauca Department